Calanthe yueana is a species of plant in the family Orchidaceae. It is endemic to China, known from Hubei and Sichuan Provinces.

References 

Endemic orchids of China
Endangered plants
yueana
Taxonomy articles created by Polbot
Plants described in 1936
Taxobox binomials not recognized by IUCN